Mai Leisz (born 5 May 1988 in Kuressaare) is an Estonian bass player and composer.

Biography 
Leisz started playing classical violin at a local children's music school when she was 6 years old and piano when she was 8. She graduated 7 years later and switched to electric bass at the age of 16. After graduating high school she moved to Tallinn in 2007. She was honored with the best instrumentalist prize at Uno Naissoo Compositions Contest in 2010.

She has graduated from Georg Ots Tallinn Music school (2010), and Skurups Folkhögskola in Sweden (2011).  She received her bachelor's degree (2014) and master's degree in Performance - Jazz at the Royal College of Music, Stockholm (2017).

During her years in Sweden, she was touring Scandinavia with different jazz, pop and rock artists including Linnea Henriksson, Doug Seegers, Norrbotten Big Band and Ebbot Lundberg. In June 2015 she played at Stockholm Waterfront with Jackson Browne after his band members Greg Leisz and Bob Glaub discovered her playing on the streets of Stockholm.  In 2016 she was honored with the Alice Babs Jazz Award and in 2017 she was nominated for the Jazz Cat Newcomer Award by Swedish radio.

MaiGroup 
During her first year studying at Skurups Folkhögskola, she gathered together a jazz-fusion band to play her own music.  MaiGroup has released three albums: "Luv" (2013), "You" (2015) and "Metamorphosis" (2019). MaiGroup's latest album features guest artists David Crosby, Greg Leisz, Bill Frisell and Charles Lloyd. First single and fourth track on the album, "Here It's Almost Sunset" feat. David Crosby is a song co-written by Mai Leisz and David Crosby.

Work with David Crosby 
After American singer-songwriter and guitarist, two-time member of the Rock and Roll Hall of Fame - David Crosby, of The Byrds and Crosby, Stills, Nash & Young, heard MaiGroup's album "You", Mai was asked to play on Crosby's record "Sky Trails".  She recorded fretless bass for the song "Before Tomorrow Falls on Love", written by Crosby and Michael McDonald (musician).  In 2016 Mai relocated to Los Angeles and did more recording for Crosby and they also started writing music together.  Their song "Here It's Almost Sunset" was released on the Sky Trails album in September 2017. In January 2017 Crosby announced Leisz to be part of the David Crosby &  Friends tour in spring 2017. In August 2017 Crosby announced a fall tour in support of the "Sky Trails" album, featuring James Raymond on keys, Mai on bass, Steve DiStanislao on drums, Jeff Pevar on guitar and Michelle Willis on keys and vocals.

Other Collaborations   
When Mai is not touring with Crosby, she can sometimes be seen as a special guest with Jackson Browne.  In January 2017 she joined Browne and Greg Leisz on stage in Jamaica.  In March 2017, she sat in with Browne, Leisz and Joan Baez in Maui, Hawaii.  She also joined Jackson and Greg on their tour in Jamaica and Florida in January 2018.

She has also collaborated with David Foster, Shawn Colvin, Ebbot Lundberg, Brady Blade, Seal (musician), Amos Lee, Carola Häggkvist, Tõnis Mägi, Riho Sibul, Magnus Lindgren, and others.

Currently she is working on new material with Michael Landau, Greg Leisz and Gary Novak.

Awards 
She has won grand prix at Alo Mattiisen Music Days (2004), Surpriser award at Tartu Jazz (2007), Best instrumentalist prize at Uno Naissoo Compositions Contest (2010) and Alice Babs Jazz Award (2016), nomination for Jazz Cat Newcomer Award by Swedish Radio 2016.

Personal life 
In April 2018, Mai married American multi-instrumentalist Greg Leisz and took his name in her personal and professional life.

References

External links 
Official website: http://maileisz.com/

Living people
1988 births
Estonian guitarists
Women bass guitarists
Royal College of Music, Stockholm alumni
People from Kuressaare
Estonian expatriates in Sweden
21st-century Estonian composers
21st-century bass guitarists
21st-century women composers